Tang Dynasty is a Chinese rock band formed in 1989. They are often credited as being the first Chinese heavy metal band.

Biography
Singer and rhythm guitarist Ding Wu, bassist Zhang Ju, and Chinese-American guitarist Kaiser Kuo co-founded Tang Dynasty in early 1989. Kaiser left shortly after to return to the United States. Liu "Lao Wu" Yijun took his place and, according to Kaiser, went on to become China's first "guitar hero." In 1991, the band released its metal/rock version of "The Internationale" in Chinese.

Tang Dynasty rose to fame with their eponymous debut album, released in December 1992. The album officially sold about 2,000,000 authentic copies throughout Asia and abroad, not counting the multitudes more of infringing copies. Their sound is part progressive rock and artistic metal and part traditional Chinese vocal technique. The lyrical poetry and musical arrangements meant to hearken back to the glorious days of ancient Chinese civilization; in particular, the art and cultural epitome of Chinese history as popularly represented by the era of the Tang dynasty.

Bassist Zhang Ju died on May 11, 1995, when his motorcycle collided with a truck on the Zizhuqiao freeway overpass in western Beijing. Gu Zhong became bass player, but in August Liu left the band. Co-founder Kaiser Kuo rejoined as guitarist in August 1996.

The band's 1998 release Epic was their second album, seven years after their debut record. Kaiser again parted company with Tang Dynasty in June 1999 and later formed another well-recognized metal/rock band, Spring and Autumn (Chunqiu). Kaiser was replaced by former Iron Kite frontman Yu Yang, and then by young guitar virtuoso Chen Lei in late 2000. After some more member changes, Liu rejoined the group in 2002.

Tang Dynasty released their third album Romantic Knight ("Langman Qishi") in mid-2008, featuring "Feng Shan Ji" as the album's lead track. Kaiser appeared in the Western documentary by Sam Dunn, Global Metal, released that same year.

In January 2009, Liu announced his second departure of the band due to "personal reasons." Vocalist Ding filled the spot of second guitarist. In February 2010, Ding Wu announced that the band was preparing for their fourth release due out later in the year. The next month, Tang Dynasty put out a two-song EP entitled Ups and Downs. The band released their fourth album, Thorn, in November 2013, and toured outside China for the first time in nearly two decades.

On February 20, 2019, Tang Dynasty revealed on Weibo that lead guitarist Chen Lei had been replaced by Liu Jingwei and Fu Dalong, again making the band a five-piece lineup.

Members 

Current members
 Ding Wu – lead vocals (1991–present), rhythm guitar (1989–2002, 2009–2019)
 Zhao Nian – drums, percussion (1989–present)
 Gu Zhong – bass, backing vocals (1995–present)
 Liu Jingwei – lead guitar (2019–present)
 Fu Dalong – lead guitar (2019–present)

 Former members
 Kaiser Kuo – lead guitar (1989, 1996–1999)
 Liu Yijun – lead guitar (1989–1996, 2003–2009)
 Zhang Ju – bass (1989–1995; died 1995), lead vocals (1989–1991), backing vocals (1991–1995)
 Yu Yang – lead guitar (1999–2000)
Chen Lei – lead guitar, backing vocals (2000–2019)
 Andrew Szabo – drums (1989)

Touring musicians
 Wang Yong - keyboards (1993–1995)

Timeline

Discography

Studio albums 

 1992 - 唐朝 (Tang Dynasty)
 1998 - 演义 (Epic)
 2008 - 浪漫骑士 (Romantic Knight)
 2013 - 芒刺 (Thorn)

EPs 

 2000 - 演义单曲纪念珍藏版 (Epic (single))
 2010 - 沉浮 (Ups and Downs)

Compilations 

 90 Modern Music Concert (1990) - "谁都希望"; "粉雾"
 China Fire I (1992) - "飞翔鸟"
 A Tribute to Teresa Teng (1995) - "独上西楼"
 Goodbye Zhang Ju (1997) - "月梦"
 True Love Forever (2000) - "花儿为什么这样红"; "明月千里寄相思"
 Gift - "春蚕"

See also
 
 Chinese heavy metal
 Chinese rock
 Cui Jian
 Dou Wei
 Overload
 Zhang Chu

References

External links
tangchao.ent
Culture Express variety show hosted by Ji Xiaojun, featuring Tang Dynasty in studio for upcoming new record
Tang Dynasty page from Rock in China site
"Kaiser Kuo, Tang Dynasty, Spring and Autumn", from China Beat radio program

Chinese heavy metal musical groups
Chinese rock music groups
Musical groups established in 1988
Musical quartets
Musical groups from Beijing